Jaret Lynn Anderson-Dolan (born September 12, 1999) is a Canadian professional ice hockey forward currently playing for the  Los Angeles Kings of the National Hockey League (NHL). Anderson-Dolan was selected in the second round of the 2017 NHL Entry Draft, 41st overall, by the Kings.

Playing career

Junior
As a 14-year old with the Edge School Mountaineers Bantam AAA team, Anderson-Dolan scored 103 points in 50 games.

Anderson-Dolan was drafted 14th in the 2014 WHL Bantam Draft to the Spokane Chiefs. He was expected to be one of the top 5 selections but slipped because some teams did not want to draft him because of his family situation. He put up 76 points in 72 regular season games in his sophomore 2016–17 season. He ended the season as the 21st ranked North American skater by NHL Central Scouting.

Professional
Anderson-Dolan was drafted 41st overall in the 2nd round of the 2017 NHL Entry Draft by the Los Angeles Kings. He signed a three-year entry level contract with the Kings on September 25, 2017.

After completing the 2017–18 season with the Chiefs, Anderson-Dolan was loaned to the Kings American Hockey League affiliate, the Ontario Reign, on April 6, 2018.

After attending the Kings training camp, Anderson-Dolan was named to the Kings opening night roster. Sitting as a healthy scratch for the Kings first game on October 5, he made his NHL debut on October 7 against the Detroit Red Wings. By making his debut, Anderson-Dolan became the youngest Kings player since Craig Redmond in 1984 and 10th youngest in franchise history. Two games later on October 11, he recorded his first career NHL point, an assist on Michael Amadio's goal, in a 3–0 win over the Montreal Canadiens. He was reassigned to the Spokane Chiefs on October 22, after playing in five NHL games and earning one point, and in the same day was added to Team WHL to compete at the 2018 CHL Canada/Russia Series. The following day, Anderson-Dolan was named co-captain of the Chiefs alongside Ty Smith. On March 16, 2019 Anderson-Dolan was awarded the Chiefs' Players' Player award for the 2018–19 season.

In the 2020–21 season, the Kings named Anderson-Dolan to their taxi squad. He was recalled to the active roster on February 5, 2021 and on February 7 scored his first NHL goal on Robin Lehner in a 4–3 loss to the Vegas Golden Knights.

As a restricted free agent, Anderson-Dolan was signed to a one-year, two-way contract extension with the Kings on July 23, 2022.

He collected his first career multi-goal game in the NHL on January 22, 2023, scoring both Kings goals in a 2-1 win over the Chicago Blackhawks.

International play

On April 12, 2017, Anderson-Dolan was selected as team captain to represent Canada at the 2017 IIHF World U18 Championships. Team Canada was eliminated in the quarter-finals against Sweden.

On December 25, 2018, Anderson-Dolan was named an alternate captain for Team Canada, along with Evan Bouchard and Ian Mitchell, for the 2019 World Junior Ice Hockey Championships.

In May 2021, Anderson-Dolan joined Team Canada at the 2021 IIHF World Championship for his first senior international tournament. He was named Canada's player of the game following their May 28 win against Kazakhstan.

Personal life
Prior to his draft year, Anderson-Dolan's personal life drew significant interest from hockey personnel. Anderson-Dolan and his older brother, Dorian were raised by two mothers, Fran and Nancy. As a result of his upbringing, Anderson-Dolan has been active in promoting support for the LGBTQ community and in efforts to end homophobia. Both of his mothers were hockey players, and he learned to skate from mother Fran, his first coach.

Career statistics

Regular season and playoffs

International

References

External links
 

1999 births
Living people
Canadian ice hockey centres
Los Angeles Kings draft picks
Los Angeles Kings players
Ontario Reign (AHL) players
Spokane Chiefs players
Ice hockey people from Calgary